The 1929 All-Ireland Minor Hurling Championship was the second staging of the All-Ireland Minor Hurling Championship since its establishment by the Gaelic Athletic Association in 1928.

Cork entered the championship as the defending champions, however, they were beaten by Tipperary in the Munster semi-final.

On 16 February 1930, Waterford won the championship following a 5-00 to 1-01 defeat of Meath in the All-Ireland final. This was their first All-Ireland title.

Results

Leinster Minor Hurling Championship

Final

Munster Minor Hurling Championship

Final

All-Ireland Minor Hurling Championship

Final

Championship statistics

Miscellaneous

 The All-Ireland final between Meath and Waterford remains their only ever championship meeting.

References

Minor
All-Ireland Minor Hurling Championship